John J. A. Gill (born 1903) was an English professional footballer who played as a goalkeeper.

Career
Born in Crook, County Durham, Gill played for Crook Town, Bearpark Welfare, Bolton Wanderers, Bradford City, Clapton Orient, Accrington Stanley and Great Harwood. For Bradford City, he made 86 appearances in the Football League; he also made 3 FA Cup appearances.

Sources

References

1903 births
Year of death missing
English footballers
Crook Town A.F.C. players
Bolton Wanderers F.C. players
Bradford City A.F.C. players
Leyton Orient F.C. players
Accrington Stanley F.C. (1891) players
Great Harwood F.C. players
English Football League players
Association football goalkeepers